Richard Serrell, better known by his stage name Richie Rich, is a rapper from Oakland, California. He currently runs his own record label, Ten-Six Records.

Music career

Early years (1987-99)
Richie Rich first entered music in the late 1980s with the group 415. With D-Loc, DJ Daryl, and JED, Rich crafted a Bay Area album in 1989 called 41Fivin, which sold well around the Bay Area and spawned a Richie Rich solo album in 1990, titled Don't Do It.

His rapping style had an influence on Snoop Dogg. In Snoop's own words 

As the group was ready to sign a major-label contract with Priority Records in 1990, however, Richie Rich was arrested for possession of cocaine. 415 released its next album and faded from the scene soon after, while Rich sat in jail; he was released a year later, and began appearing on tracks by 2Pac and the Luniz. Richie Rich soon found himself being in the middle of a bidding war between Def Jam Records and Relativity Records.  He choose to go on Russell Simmons' label Def Jam.  Before forming his own label, Oakland Hills 41510, he released his second solo album in 1996, Half Thang, which peaked on the Billboard Top R&B/Hip-Hop Albums at number 57.

By 1995, Richie Rich had become the first Bay Area rapper to sign with New York's Def Jam Records, and his major-label album, Seasoned Veteran, was released in late 1996 Seasoned Veteran did rather well on the charts, and music videos were soon released for three songs on the album. Just as Rich's career was booming, a merger at Def Jam (with PolyGram) left him without much direction. Richie Rich was going to release a second album on Def Jam, although it kept getting pushed back. He soon had the decision to stay or go, he decided to go.

Ten-Six Record Years (1999-present)
Rich then started his own label with partner Lev Berlak, named Ten-Six Records. Four years after Seasoned Veteran, his fourth album The Game was released. The album has sold over 300,000 units independently but was panned by critics and fans alike.

In 2021, Rich's 1996 song Let's Ride was featured in the television series Blindspotting.

Discography

Studio albums
 Don't Do It (1990)
 Half Thang (1996)
 Seasoned Veteran (1996)
 The Game (2000)
 Nixon Pryor Roundtree (2002)
 Fed Case (2017)

Collaboration albums
 41Fivin with 415 (1989)
 The Grow Room with The Mekanix (2020)

Compilation albums
 Greatest Hits (2000)
 Grabs, Snatches & Takes (2004)

Mixtapes and street albums
 Town Bidness (2010)
 Town Bidness Volume 2 (2011)

Extended plays
 Geeks Revenge (Rodney) (1990)

Guest appearances

References

External links
 Richie Rich at Discogs

1966 births
21st-century American rappers
African-American male rappers
African-American record producers
Def Jam Recordings artists
Gangsta rappers
G-funk artists
Living people
Rappers from Oakland, California
Record producers from California
21st-century African-American male singers
20th-century African-American male singers